Gharganeh (also Romanized as Ghargāneh; also known as Qargāneh and Zobeydī) is a village in Buzi Rural District, in the Central District of Shadegan County, Khuzestan Province, Iran. At the 2006 census, its population was 100, in 22 families.

References 

Populated places in Shadegan County